Professor Rajendra Prasad Das (1930–2006) was an Indian archaeologist, an authority on the construction history of Hindu temples, a noted historian, a respected academician and an award-winning novelist.

Professional life

Archaeology
Professor Rajendra Prasad Das is credited with discovery of a chalcolithic site in the Prehistoric Ganges Basin of India, an important archaeological find. During his tenure with the Archaeological Survey of India (ASI) Rajendra identified a 230 X 135 m site at Mahisdal located on the left bank of the Kopai River in Birbhum District of West Bengal for archaeological excavation.

Das led the ASI excavations in 1963-64 of the site which unearthed significant archaeological remains that date back to 1619-1415 BC. The findings include a rich assortment of red and black plain and painted ceramics, copper, beads of steatite and semi-precious stones, bone tools, bone bangles and decorated combs that establish Mahisdal a chalcolithic site of considerable importance in the Prehistoric Ganges Basin of India. Substantial quantities of burnt (carbonized) grains of rice found at the site suggest a massive fire that destroyed the settlement.

Palm-leaf manuscripts
Das pioneered the technique of deciphering and transcribing the texts written in Karani script etched on palm leaves, which constituted palm-leaf-manuscripts of historical events as well as of scholarly texts. In collaboration with Alice Boner, and Sadasiva Rath Sarma, Das translated and annotated four unpublished texts from a number of palm-leaf-manuscripts relating to the construction history and ritual of the famous Sun Temple of Konarka built in the thirteenth century.

This pioneering project led to the publication of New Light on the Sun Temple of Konarka in 1972.  This book systematically describes the architecture of the Sun Temple of Konarka and the surrounding shrines, rituals of worship and yantras, detailed history of construction, chronicles and accounts of building operations, and the religious rituals of the temple.

Das collaborated with Bettina Bäumer to transcribe the seventeenth century Orissan text, the Silparatnakosa, which is a glossary of Orissan temple architecture, and describes all the parts of all the most important temple types of Orissa such as the Manjushri and Khaakaara, and also contains a section on sculpture. This text was edited from three palm-leaf-manuscripts, and is an important work of the Silpa/Vastu literature of India.

He also collaborated with Baumer and Sadananda Das to completely revise and translate Silpa Prakasa, based on palm-leaf-manuscripts transcribed earlier by Boner, and Sarma.  Silpa Prakasa is a tenth-century text on temple architecture that describes various temple types, temple construction, and the iconography and symbolism of the unique Orissan temples.

Academic

Das was first in BA Honours in History, and first class first and gold medallist in MA in History from Utkal University. He was the President and General Secretary of Ravenshaw College Union. As a keen debater, Das had won many laurels including the Borasambar Senapati Prize in 1950 and Utkal University Chancellor’s cup. He was principal of several government colleges of Orissa, vice-chairman of Plus Two Board of Orissa, Deputy Director of Public Instruction (DPI) of Higher Education of Orissa, and retired as a Professor of History of Gangadhar Meher College (presently an Autonomous College) of Sambalpur, Orissa.

As a creative writer, Das wrote Aji Kali Pa’ridina (1986), which received the Odisha Sahitya Akademi Award for fiction in 1988.  He also wrote a collection of short-stories entitled Cahinle Akasa, which was published in 1992.

In 1969, Das co-authored with Brajendra Kumar Sethi a high school textbook on Indian history in the Odia language, entitled Bharati Bharata Itihasa. It was the first regional language textbook of India to describe the national uprising of 1857 as the "First National Campaign of Independence", rather than following the hitherto accepted phraseology of "Sepoy Mutiny".

Personal life

Rajendra Prasad Das was born on 15 July 1930, in Samia village of Jajpur District of Orissa, to Alekh Prasad Das and Snehalata Devi, who were disciples of Mahatma Gandhi, noted freedom fighters and social workers. Alekh Prasad Das who had refused to join post-independence politics to pursue the programs conceived by Gandhiji for emancipation of the people in the grassroots was also an award-winning writer who won the Orissa Sahitya Akademi Award for his autobiography Jibanara Daka.

Das was married to Saudamini Devi, an artist and writer, who wrote under the penname Utkalika Das. Her books Punya Mandakini, and Bhabaku Nikata have won critical acclaim.  He died in May 2006, and is survived by six children, and grandchildren.

References

20th-century Indian archaeologists
1930 births
2006 deaths
Scientists from Odisha
Writers from Odisha
Odia-language writers
Utkal University alumni
Recipients of the Odisha Sahitya Akademi Award
Historians of India